Huggle is a very small medieval village in Heby, Uppsala, Sweden. The village is lacking in a land taxation list from 1312, but is mentioned in writing in 1454, so it is likely to have been founded in the meantime.

Populated places in Uppsala County
Populated places in Heby Municipality